James John Kannis (born 5 November 1985) is a Greek-Australian singer who participated in the reality television talent show, Australian Idol. Kannis was placed in seventh position.

Career
Kannis auditioned for the third series of Australian Idol, perming the self-written song, "A Dollar Away". Kannis made it through the live shows, placing 7th.

Following his Australian Idol Run, Kannis  signed with Zeus Records/Shock. His debut single, "Love 2 Love", which was released on 11 November 2006 peaked at No. 35 on the ARIA Singles Chart,

Discography

Singles

See also
Australian Idol 2005

References 

1985 births
Australian people of Greek descent
Australian Idol participants
Australian contemporary R&B singers
Living people
21st-century Australian singers
21st-century Australian male singers